An eye for an eye is a quotation from Exodus 21:23–27, expressing a principle of retributive justice.

Eye for an Eye, An Eye for an Eye, or Eye for Eye may also refer to:

Film 
 Eye for Eye (1918 film), a film starring Alla Nazimova
 An Eye for an Eye (1957 film), originally titled Oeil pour oeil a film starring Curd Jürgens (usually billed in English-speaking films as Curt Jurgens)
 An Eye for an Eye (1966 film), a film starring Slim Pickens
 Drummer of Vengeance or An Eye for an Eye original titled Il giorno del giudizio, a 1971 Italian Spaghetti Western
 Eye for an Eye (Alberto Mariscal film) or El sabor de la venganza a 1971 Italian Spaghetti Western starring Isela Vega
 An Eye for an Eye, a 1973 horror thriller film starring John Ashton
 An Eye for an Eye (1981 film), a film starring Chuck Norris
 Eye for an Eye (1996 film), a film starring Sally Field, Kiefer Sutherland and Ed Harris
 An Eye for an Eye (1999 film), a Finnish horror film starring Meri Nenonen and Jani Volanen
 Eye for an Eye (2008 film), a South Korean film starring Han Suk-kyu
 An Eye for an Eye (2016 film), a documentary film
 The Poison Rose, also known as An Eye for an Eye, a 2019 American film
 Eye for an Eye (2019 film), a Spanish film

Literature 
 An Eye for an Eye (novel), an 1879 novel by Anthony Trollope
 An Eye for an Eye: The Untold Story of Jewish Revenge Against Germans in 1945, a history book by John Sack
 An Eye for an Eye, a 2003 novella in the Noughts & Crosses series by Malorie Blackman

Music 
 Eye for an Eye (band), a Polish punk rock band
 Eye for an Eye (Corrosion of Conformity album) (1984)
 An Eye for an Eye (Like Moths to Flames album) (2013)
 An Eye for an Eye (RBL Posse album)
 Eye for an Eye (Twilight album) (1994)
 "Eye for an Eye" (song), a 1998 song by Soulfly
 "Eye for an Eye (Your Beef Is Mines)", a 1995 song by Mobb Deep from The Infamous
 "Eye for an Eye", a 2003 single by Unkle
 "Eye for an Eye", a song by Quiet Riot from Quiet Riot II

Television 
 Eye for an Eye (2003 TV program), an American comedy courtroom reality television program that was broadcast in syndication
 Eye for an Eye (2010 TV series), an American Spanish-language telenovela that aired on Telemundo
 "Eye for an Eye", an episode of Danny Phantom
 "An Eye for an Eye", an episode of NCIS
 "Eye for an Eye", an episode of War of the Worlds

See also
 Eye for Eye, a 1987 novella by Orson Scott Card
 Eye to Eye (disambiguation)